Falaniakos A.C. is a local football (soccer) club based in Falani in Larissa, Greece that was created in 1960.  In 1991, Falaniakos participated in the national Fourth Division for a couple of seasons and now it currently participates in the first division of the prefectural Larissa Football Clubs Association.  Their team colours are yellow and black.

History

In the 1920s and the 1930s, youngsters from Falani participated in the soccer club under the name "Falaniakos" and played friendly matches with teams from other areas and it did not have an official character.  Falaniakos was formed in 1960 under the name "AC Falaniakos Falanis" and started to play in local championships and later played in higher divisions and entered the first local division in 1970.

Titles, Second Place and Elevations
1961-62: Winner of the Larissa FCA Third Division.
1963-64: Winner of the Larissa FCA Second Division
1964-69: Winner of the Larissa FCA Second Division
1971-72: Finalist of the Larissa FCA Cup.
1976-77: Second Place of the Larissa FCA Premier Division, elevated to the National Third Division
1978-79: Larissa FCA Cup - Finalist
1979-80: Winner of the Larissa FCA Premier Division
1990-91: Second Place of the Larissa FCA, elevated to the National Fourth Division
1992-93: Champions of the Larissa FCA, elevated again to the National Fourth Division
2001-02: Championship of the Larissa FCA, returned to the National Fourth Division
2002-03: Cup winner of the Larissa FCA

In national divisions

In the 1977-78 season, as second place of the prefectural championship, elevated into the today's third division (then National Amateur Division.  It was the highest category that Falaniakos participated.  Falaniakos finished 15th with 28 points (40-68 goals) and relegated to the locals.
In the 1991-92 season, as second place of the prefectural championship, elevated into the fourth division and was later relegated
In the 1993-94 season, as champion of Larissa FCA, returned to the fourth division
In the 2002-03 season, as champion of Larissa FCA, returned again to the fourth division and it last participation to date.

Notable players
 Takis Parafestas
 Nikos Kakakoulias
 Vassilis Ziogas
 Giannis Igglezos

References

External links
Φαλανιακός: Μισός αιώνας ζωής. (Falaniakos, A Half-Century of Existence) Newspaper Eleftheria 
Φαλανιακός: Ένα βήμα παραπάνω (Falaniakos: One step forward) Newspaper Eleftheria 

Larissa
Football clubs in Thessaly
Association football clubs established in 1960
1960 establishments in Greece